The year 1627 in music involved some significant events.

Events 
 January 13 – Tarquinio Merula is officially appointed maestro di cappella in Cremona, after having been elected provisionally the previous year.
 June 21 – Christopher Gibbons election as a scholar of the Charterhouse is approved by the Governors, following his nomination in January through the Signet Office.

Published music 
 Giovanni Battista Abatessa – , a collection of songs with alfabeto notation, for the guitar, published in Venice
 Giacinto Bondioli – Psalms for five voices, Op. 8 (Venice: Bartolomeo Magni for Gardano)
 Carlo Farina

 Melchior Franck
 for four, five, and six instruments with basso continuo (Coburg: Johann Forckel for Friederich Gruner), a collection of intradas
 for seven voices and organ bass (Coburg: Johann Forckel), a wedding motet
 for six voices (Coburg: Johann Forckel), a wedding motet
 Sigismondo d'India – First book of motets for four voices (Venice: Alessandro Vincenti)
 Carlo Milanuzzi –  for two and three voices, book 1, Op. 14 (Venice: Alessandro Vincenti)
 Francesco Pasquali – Third book of madrigals, Op. 5 (Rome: Paolo Masotti)

Classical music 
 Girolamo Frescobaldi – Il secondo libro di toccate
 Johann Ulrich Steigleder – Tabulaturbuch, 40 variations on Vater unser

Opera 
Heinrich Schütz – Dafne

Births 
April 9 – Johann Caspar Kerll, organist and composer (died 1693)

Deaths 
March 23 – Lodovico Zacconi, composer (born 1555)
May 2 – Lodovico Grossi da Viadana, Italian composer and monk (born c.1560)
August 21 – Jacques Mauduit, composer (born 1557)
November 30 – Pedro Ruimonte, musician and composer (born 1565)
December – Thomas Lupo the elder, viol player and composer (born 1571)
date unknown
Abdul Rahim Khan-I-Khana, poet and composer (born 1556)
Leone Leoni, composer (born c.1560)

References 

 
Music
17th century in music
Music by year